The Pacific Conference Games were a quadrennial athletics competition, held between 1969 and 1985 and contested by Australia, Canada, Japan, New Zealand and the United States. Each of the five nations hosted an edition of the competition before its dissolution in 1985. The 1981 and 1985 events were open to athletes from all nations.

The event was proposed at the 1967 Summer Universiade in a specially scheduled meeting by Japanese national sports officials to their counterparts for the four other developed, Western nations with Pacific coasts. The intention was to hold a high level, two-day international track and field competition one year after each Summer Olympic Games. It was suggested in contemporary reports that the limited invitational format was designed to exclude the Soviet Union (which had boycotted the Tokyo Summer Universiade.

The idea of a Pacific region sports competition was revived at the Pacific Ocean Games and an athletics competition featured at the sole edition in 1995. The games were abandoned after their first edition, however.

Editions

References

Results
Pacific Conference Games medal results
Results for Australian athletes from Athletics Australia

 
International athletics competitions
Defunct athletics competitions
Recurring sporting events established in 1969
1985 disestablishments
Quadrennial sporting events